The Portland Rockies were a minor league baseball team that played in Portland, Oregon. The Rockies were members of the Class A-Short Season Northwest League for six years, from 1995 through 2000. Prior to relocating to Portland, the franchise played in Bend, Oregon as the Bend Rockies from 1992 until 1994.

History
The Rose City was without baseball as then-owner Joe Buzas relocated the Portland Beavers of the Class AAA Pacific Coast League to Salt Lake City following the 1993 season. Calgary Cannons owner Russ Parker threatened to move his club south to Portland, but ultimately remained in Alberta. With Oregon's largest city open, the Bend Rockies opted to fill the void by relocating from  Central Oregon. The Bend Rockies were the parent club's first minor league team, continued their affiliation in the move to Portland.

The Rockies had success in Portland, including a league championship in 1997. Although few Class A teams play in cities as large as Portland, the Rockies were able to maintain local interest in baseball. The team served an important role for the city, whose demand for a major league team was growing.

With the community's support for the Portland Rockies, Civic Stadium was renovated in 2000 to regain Triple-A baseball. Their efforts proved to be successful as the Albuquerque Dukes moved from New Mexico to Portland and became a new incarnation of the Triple-A Beavers for the 2001 PCL season. The displaced Northwest League franchise relocated up the Columbia River to Pasco, Washington located in the Tri-Cities area. The team was renamed the Tri-City Dust Devils.

Identity
Their name and logo mimicked the mountain theme of the Colorado club, even though Portland is not located in the Rocky Mountains. A rose was added to the team's cap logo to signify Portland's nickname, the "Rose City."

Ballpark
The Rockies played at Civic Stadium (now known as Providence Park) located in Portland. In 2000, PGE Park was renovated and a new incarnation of the AAA Beavers moved into the stadium in 2001. With the departure of professional baseball the stadium was converted into a soccer only venue in 2011 as part of a $31 million reinvention and is now the home of the Portland Timbers.

Season-by-season record

Former players
Notable former Portland Rockies include MLB players Chone Figgins, Juan Pierre, Clint Barmes, Brad Hawpe, Jake Westbrook, and Garrett Atkins.

Portland Rockies players (1995–2000)

References

External links
 Minor League Geek Portland Rockies

Defunct Northwest League teams
Rockies
Defunct baseball teams in Oregon
Colorado Rockies minor league affiliates
Professional baseball teams in Oregon
1995 establishments in Oregon
2000 disestablishments in Oregon
Baseball teams established in 1995
Baseball teams disestablished in 2000
Baseball in Portland, Oregon